West Northfield School District 31 is an elementary school district with schools located in Northbrook, Illinois and Glenview, Illinois.

Schools
Henry Winkelman Elementary School

Winkelman School was named after Henry Winkelman, the original janitor.

Stanley Field Middle School

Field School was named after Stanley Field, the nephew of Marshall Field.

Stanley Field Middle School as well as Winkelman school were known for their blue ribbon in 2003.

External links 
Official District 31 Site

Northbrook, Illinois
Glenview, Illinois
School districts in Cook County, Illinois